= Schmiede- und Schlossermuseum Schwalbach =

Coordinates: 49°17′42″N 6°47′50.7″E

Schmiede- und Schlossermuseum Schwalbach is a museum of smithery and locks in Saarland, Germany.
